Transamidation is a chemical reaction in which an amide reacts with an amine to generate a new amide:
RC(O)NR'2  +  HNR"2  →   RC(O)NR"2  +  HNR'2

The reaction is typically very slow, but it can be accelerated with Lewis acid and organometallic catalysts.  Primary amides (RC(O)NH2) are more amenable to this reaction.

Ureas
In contrast to the reluctance of amides as substrates, urea is more susceptible to this exchange process. Transamidation is practiced, sometimes even on an industrial scale, to prepare a variety of N-substituted ureas:
(H2N)2CO  +  R2NH   →    (R2N)(H2N)CO  +  NH3
(R2N)(H2N)CO  +  R2NH   →    (R2N)2CO  +  NH3
Methylurea, precursor to theobromine, is produced from methylamine and urea.  Phenylurea is produced similarly but from anilinium chloride:
(H2N)2CO  +  [C6H5NH3]Cl   →    (C6H5(H)N)(H2N)CO  +  NH4Cl

Hydrazine derivatives of urea are often produced by transamidation-like reactions.  These products include carbohydrazide, semicarbazide, and biurea.

References

Amides
Chemical reactions